The Liebherr T 282 series are off-highway, ultra class, rigid frame, two axle, diesel-electric, AC powertrain haul trucks designed and manufactured in the United States by Liebherr Mining Equipment Co.

The Liebherr T 282 series is no longer in production, however, due to the extended service life of this equipment, many are still in operation on mines around the world. The T 282 series is succeeded by the Liebherr T 284.

T 282 
The T 282 was succeeded by the T 282 B, designed in Newport News, Virginia with a  payload capacity.

Development and testing 
Liebherr developed a  payload capacity haul truck for large-scale mining operations.

Engineers at Liebherr Mining Equipment Newport News Co. designed the T 282 to have the lightest Empty Vehicle Weight (EVW) respective to its payload capacity. The T 282 was the first mining haul truck designed by Liebherr following the company's acquisition of existing haul truck manufacturing company, WISEDA, LTD.

The first T 282s were tested extensively at Liebherr's proving grounds.

Features 
The T 282 standard features included air suspension seats, double shell concept for safety, thermal and acoustical isolation, emergency engine shutdown, environmentally controlled cab, safety glass with tinted windshield, cast steel components in stress areas, double a-frame front suspension system with inclined king pin, back up warning alarm, and more.

Optional features included L&M radiator, monitoring systems, special paint, cold climate kit, AM/FM radio with cassette player, electric starter, engine heater, canopy spill guards, body liner, and more.

Engine 
The T 282 is powered by an electric drive system.

Manufacturing and assembly
No longer in production, the T 282 B was assembled at the Liebherr Mining Equipment Co. production facility in Newport News, Virginia.

The chassis (frame, axle box, engine, radiator, fan, and alternator) are assembled for shipment alongside the superstructure (operators' cabin, grid box, and drive system). All other components are implemented on-site with the customer.

T 282 B 
The T 282 B succeeds the T 282.

Development and testing 
In October 2003, Liebherr introduced the T 282 B haul truck for large-scale mining operations to reduce cost and increase productivity. The large dump body allowed for each T 282 B operating to carry more material per haul, with fewer trips from loading tool to fill pile.

The T 282 B requires fewer operating hours to achieve the same level of production as trucks produced by other companies. The low EVW was achievable due to the lightweight AC drive system, use of less heavy components, and "stress flow" design, which allowed for lighter steel structures and casings, which in turn yield a lighter and stronger frame.

The first T 282 Bs were tested extensively at Liebherr's proving grounds.

Public debut 
Liebherr introduced the T 282 B at the Bauma trade fair in Munich, Germany, on March 29, 2004. The T 282 B is the successor to the T 282, designed in Newport News, a  payload capacity,  diesel/AC electric drive haul truck introduced in 1998. At the time of its launch in 2004, the T 282 B offered the largest haul truck payload capacity in the world, and remained unmatched in payload capacity for over four years.

Features 
The T 282 B standard features include an in-cab display screen displaying truck status, fuel consumption, and payload monitoring and downloads. All Liebherr mining trucks include HVAC for operator comfort. The T 282 B is fully compatible with the Liebherr Trolley Assist System, built to save on fuel consumption without sacrificing productivity. Trolley assist is only available for trucks with electric drive systems.

Powertrain and engine
The T 282 B is powered by a diesel/electric powertrain. The diesel engine is coupled to a Siemens-Liebherr AC electric drive system.

Two diesel engines are available:

 a  DDC/MTU 20V4000,  V20
  Cummins QSK 78  V18.

Braking systems 
The T 282 B features an electric dynamic retard with continuously rated, fan-forced air over stainless steel resistor grid, with a dry disc secondary braking system. Additional features include extended speed range, cruise control, two speed over speed, slip slide traction control, front/rear service brakes, hydraulic accumulators, park brakes, and filtration.

Manufacturing and assembly
No longer in production, the T 282 B was assembled at the Liebherr Mining Equipment Co. production facility in Newport News.

The chassis (frame, axle box, engine, radiator, fan, and alternator) are assembled for shipment alongside the superstructure (operators' cabin, grid box, and drive system). All other components are implemented on-site with the customer.

Specifications

T 282 C 
The T 282 C succeeds the T 282 B, introduced in 2004. The T 282 series is succeeded by the Liebherr T 284.

Development and testing 
The combination of its high power diesel engine with the efficient Litronic Plus drive system maximizes productivity while reducing fuel consumption.

Engineers incorporated the Litronic Plus drive system and improvements to the electrical systems, including machine health and monitoring systems to offer real-time diagnostics for instantaneous improved reliability and maintainability.

The first T 282 Cs were tested extensively at Liebherr's proving grounds.

Public debut 
The T 282 C was unveiled at the Bauma trade fair in Munich, Germany, in April 2010.

Features 
The T 282 C standard features include the Litronic Plus drive system with real-time fault warning and detection system, CAN Bus technology for flexible monitoring, truck diagnostics, air ride seats with 3 point seatbelts, improved HVAC, greater visibility, and an integrated  colour touch screen in operator cab (displays truck status, fuel consumption, payload monitoring, and downloads).

Litronic Plus IGBT AC drive system 
Designed for mining environments, the control cabinet with integrated rectifier is liquid-cooled, and includes a ground fault warning and detection system. The pressurized cabinet for dust control requires fewer components than GTO drive systems.

Tier 2 engine 
Water-cooled turbo chargers and exhaust manifold keep the engine cool, while the ADEC engine control module monitors fuel consumption and exhaust temperatures at multiple points.

Improved electrical systems 
The T 282 C electrical system has a number of improvements over the T 282 B, including moving the rectifier to the control box, reducing the wiring with Harnessflex conduit, protection against dirt and water ingress via heat shrink connectors, and reducing voltage drip for the starting circuit.

Manufacturing and assembly 
No longer in production, the T 282 C was manufactured and assembled at the Liebherr Mining Equipment Co. production facility in Newport News.  

The chassis (frame, axle box, engine, radiator, fan, and alternator) are assembled for shipment alongside the superstructure (operators' cabin, grid box, and drive system). All other components are implemented on-site with the customer.

Specifications

Transportation of the T 282 series
Due to its exceptional size and weight, the T 282 series cannot be driven on public roads. The T 282 series was shipped in component form to the customer site before undergoing final assembly.

Cost of the T 282 series 
No longer in production, the price of each T 282 model varied based upon customer specification and quantity ordered. Each T 282 truck cost US$4–5 million and Liebherr previously sold dozens of the T 282 series each year, primarily to coal, copper, iron ore and gold mine operators in the U.S., Chile, Indonesia, South Africa and Australia.

Service life of the T 282 series 
Liebherr offers a flexible component exchange program for replacement of all major components, and maintains affiliates around the world for speedy parts deliveries. The design life of the truck is dependent upon the chassis and frame, which typically last for an average of 72,000 hours.

Competition
The T 282 B competed directly with other  payload capacity haul trucks.

References

External links 

 Liebherr T 282 Mining Truck - Liebherr-International Deutschland GmbH
 Liebherr T 282B with payload capacity of 400t

Haul trucks
See also
Vehicles introduced in 2004